Jund al-Urdunn (translation: "The military district of Jordan") was one of the five districts of Bilad al-Sham (Islamic Syria) during the early Islamic period. It was established under the Rashidun and its capital was Tiberias throughout its rule by the Umayyad and Abbasid caliphates. It encompassed southern Mount Lebanon, the Galilee, the southern Hauran, the Golan Heights, and most of the eastern Jordan Valley (especially in the north).

Subdistricts and major towns
The 10th-century geographer Ibn al-Faqih held that besides its capital at Tiberias, the Urdunn's chief districts (qura) were Samaria (al-Samira in Arabic), i.e. Nablus, Beisan, Qadas, Pella (Fahl in Arabic), Jerash, Acre (Akka in Arabic), and Tyre (Sur in Arabic). The geographer al-Muqaddasi (d. 985) notes that the principal towns of the district were its capital Tiberias, Qadas, Tyre, Acre, Faradiyya, Kabul, Beisan, Lajjun and Adhri'at. The 13th-century geographer Yaqut al-Hamawi counted the quras of Urdunn as Tiberias, Beisan, Acre, Beit Ras, Jadar (Jaydur, area adjacent to the east of the Golan Heights), Tyre and Saffuriya.

The geographers Ibn Hawqal (d. ) and Estakhri (d. 957) noted the Ghawr (Jordan Valley) district, the low-lying area along the Jordan River between Lake Tiberias to the Dead Sea, with its capital at Jericho (Ariha in Arabic), was administratively subordinate to Urdunn. The geographer al-Ya'qubi (d. 892) held that the Ghawr was subordinate to Jund Dimashq.

Population

Galilee 
The Galilee was referred to as "Jabal al-Jalil" by the 9th century Arab geographer Ya'qubi (d. 891), who noted that its residents were Arabs from the Amila tribe. Michael Ehrlich asserts that while the majority of people in the Western Galilee and Lower Galilee probably embraced Islam during the Early Islamic period, the Islamization process in the Eastern Galilee took a little longer and lasted until the Mamluk period.

Governors

Rashidun period
Yazid ibn Abi Sufyan (639, appointed by Caliph Umar after the death of the overall governor of Syria Abu Ubayda ibn al-Jarrah; concurrently governed the junds of Dimashq and Filastin)
Mu'awiya ibn Abi Sufyan (639-), may have been appointed to the post by Umar after the death of his brother Yazid in 639, when he was appointed to Dimashq)
Abu al-A'war al-Sulami, governor under Mu'awiya.

Umayyad period
Abu Uthman ibn Marwan ibn al-Hakam (685–705, governed for unspecified period during his brother Caliph Abd al-Malik's rule; identified by Moshe Gil as Aban ibn Marwan, while Asad Q. Ahmed identified him with another brother of Abd al-Malik, Uthman ibn Marwan)
Ubayda ibn Abd al-Rahman al-Sulami (685–705, governed for unspecified period during Abd al-Malik's reign; nephew of Abu al-A'war)
Umar ibn al-Walid (705–715, governed during the rule of his father Caliph al-Walid I)
Ubada ibn Nusayy al-Kindi (717–720, governed during the rule of Caliph Umar II)
Ishaq ibn Qabisa ibn Dhu'ayb al-Khuza'i (724–743, governed during the rule of Caliph Hisham; son of one of Abd al-Malik's brother-in-laws and secretaries)
Al-Walid ibn Mu'awiya ibn Marwan (744–750, governed during the rule of his cousin Caliph Marwan II; a nephew of Abd al-Malik)

Abbasid period
Abdallah ibn Ali (752–753, governed during the rule of his nephew Caliph al-Saffah)
Ziyad ibn Abi al-Ward (amil, i.e. a fiscal supervisor, under Abdallah ibn Ali))
Muhammad ibn Ibrahim (754–775, governed during the rule of his uncle Caliph al-Mansur; also governed Dimashq during al-Mansur's rule)

See also
 Greater Syria
 Jordan River
 Jund Filastin
 Levant
 Mashriq
 Middle East
 Palaestina Secunda
 Shaam

References

Bibliography

Medieval Palestine
Medieval Jordan
Medieval Israel
Medieval Lebanon
Subdivisions of the Abbasid Caliphate
States and territories established in the 7th century
Military history of the Umayyad Caliphate
Syria under the Umayyad Caliphate
Palestine under the Umayyad Caliphate
Palestine under the Abbasid Caliphate